Klein is an unincorporated community in Harris County, Texas, United States, roughly bordering Texas State Highway 99 to the north, Texas State Highway 249 to the west, Interstate 45 to the east, and the city of Houston to the south. It includes the entire area of Klein ISD. Residents of the zip codes 77066, 77069, 77086, 77379, 77388, 77389 and 77391 can use Klein as their postal city. Klein is one of the most diverse, as well as being one of the largest unincorporated areas of Houston.

It is named after Adam Klein, a German immigrant whose best-known great-great-grandson is singer Lyle Lovett. Other famous sons and daughters of the Klein community include actor Jim Parsons, actor Lee Pace, actor Matthew Bomer, actress Lynn Collins, actress Sherry Stringfield, singer/songwriter Derek Webb, songwriter Aaron Tate, singer/songwriter Chase Hamblin, actor Ben Rappaport, Major League Baseball players David Murphy and Josh Barfield, NFL players Randy Bullock, Ashton Youboty, Mike Green (running back), and Olympic gold medalists Laura Wilkinson, Simone Biles, and Chad Hedrick as well as Kevin M. Klein chef and restaurateur 

Klein is served by David Wayne Hooks Memorial Airport, one of just a few privately owned airports in the U.S. to have a Federal Aviation Administration control tower, and home to Civil Air Patrol's Delta Composite Squadron.

Geography
Klein has a Humid subtropical climate with a 9a Hardiness zone. The area is susceptible to hurricanes and flooding.

The area serves as a fringe ecocline  boundary between the Piney Woods, southern post oak savanna, and prairie land as an extension of the Western Gulf coastal grasslands.

Much of the original ecosystem had been cleared for farming. Since then, the community has been rapidly built up by subdivisions, businesses, and mixed land use — and thus very little of the area represents its native ecosystem.

Most of the core Klein area sits between Spring Creek to the north, separating Tomball to the northwest by Willow Creek, and Cypress Creek is the waterway that passes through the center of the greater Klein area. Both these creeks are tributaries to lower Spring Creek (Harris County, Texas) and ultimately Lake Houston.

Parcels along Cypress Creek contain a mix of older undisturbed bottomland forest, private residence, and well-maintained bike trails through public parks.

Prairie-like stretches of oak (Quercus virginiana) and various hardwoods, draped in Spanish moss, are present in and around the Raveneaux Country Club, Klein High School, as well as in public spaces such as Meyer Park.

The Klein Kissing Tree is in Klein. In April 2020 the Texas A&M Forest Service designated it as one of several historic "kissing trees" in the state.

Flora
A well-preserved oxbow lake habitat can be found in the Ponderosa Walking Park. Dwarf palmetto Sabal minor and southern magnolia Magnolia grandiflora trees are found in the understory and near the edges of bodies of water and swamps, as well as bald cypress (Taxodium distichum) sweetgum (Liquidambar styraciflua), water oak (Quercus nigra), and black tupelo (Nyssa sylvatica) all being present.

Fauna
Reptiles from common species like the Red-ear slider turtle, and green anole (Anolis carolinensis), American green tree frog, to more precarious species such as the venomous Texas coral snake Micrurus tener, and the American alligator.

Government and infrastructure

Local government
Harris County ESD 16 dba "Klein Fire Department", headquartered at 16810 Squyres Road and operates with eight stations, serves areas considered to be Klein. KFD stations in areas with Klein postal addresses. Klein FD is funded by Harris County ESD 16.

Harris County ESD 16 "Klein Fire Department" is governed by 5 elected commissioners. 

Klein FD is operated under a Fire Chief, Deputy Fire Chief, 2 District Chiefs and 3 Safety Officers.

Klein FD station locations.

Station 31 at 18337 Stuebner-Airline Rd.  -  Engine 31, Tower 31, Tanker 31

Station 32 at Gladebrook and West FM 1960.  -  Engine 32

Station 33 at 9755 Landry Blvd.  -  Engine 33, Rescue 33, Reserve Engine 303, Training Engine 301

Station 34 at 16810 Squyres Rd.  -  Engine 34, Tower 34, Air 30, District 30

Station 35 at Boudreaux near Miramar Lake Blvd.  -  Engine 35, Rehab 35, Tanker 35
 
Station 36 at N. Eldridge Parkway at North Point Blvd.  -  Engine 36, Tower 36, Booster 36

Station 37 at 5518 Winding Ridge Dr.  -  Engine 37, Rescue 37, Utility 37, Rescue Boat 37, UTV 37

Station 38 at 6900 Crescent Clover Dr.  -  Engine 38, Booster 38

County, state, and federal representation
Klein is now located within Harris County Precinct 3 after redistricting following the 2020 Census. As of October 28, 2021, Tom S. Ramsey is the Precinct 3 County Commissioner.

The community is served by the Harris County Sheriff's Office District I Patrol, headquartered from the Cypresswood Substation at 6831 Cypresswood Drive.

The Harris Health System (formerly Harris County Hospital District) designated the Acres Homes Health Center for the ZIP code 77379. The designated public hospital is Lyndon B. Johnson Hospital in northeast Houston.

Dan Crenshaw is the U.S. representative for the 2nd congressional district serving Klein, Texas. State Representative Valoree Swanson represents the 150th legislative district. 
The United States Postal Service operates the Klein Post Office at 7717 Louetta Road.

Education

The Klein community is primarily served by the Klein Independent School District. However a few minuscule portions of Klein are served by the Spring ISD and the Cypress-Fairbanks ISD.

The Klein ISD area joined the North Harris Montgomery Community College District (now Lone Star College) in 1998. The Texas Legislature designated Klein ISD a part of the Lone Star College district.

Demographics
The 2016 estimate for the Klein area was 200,805 people. The racial makeup of the town was 46.3 percent White, 32.4 percent Black, 0.6 percent Native American, 14.8 percent Asian, 0.1 percent Pacific Islander, 5.8 percent from other races. Persons of Hispanic origin, regardless of race, accounted for 28.9 percent of the population.  About 21.7% of families live below the poverty line.

Black Americans have been well represented in the Kohrville community dating back since the Reconstruction era. Kohrville school served the area up until 1928, when students were consolidated into Rural High School District Number One, which eventually became Klein High School.

Parks and recreation
Harris County Precinct 4 Commissioner operates the  Klein Park. The park has four lighted athletic ball fields and toilet facilities.

Meyer Park, a 40-acre park,  which straddles Cypresswood Road has 38 multiple-sized soccer fields for different age groups. The park also has 4 baseball fields, a playground, a dog park, toilet facilities, and pavilions.

References

External links

 
  Hooks Airport Web Site
  Delta Composite Squadron, Civil Air Patrol
  Klein Volunteer Fire Department
  Cypress Creek EMS
 Klein Independent School District
 Story about Lyle Lovett's connection to Klein

Unincorporated communities in Texas
Unincorporated communities in Harris County, Texas
German-American history